Kyaw Tint Swe (born 19 March 1945) is a Burmese politician and former Minister for the Office of the State Counsellor of Myanmar.

Career
Kyaw Tint Swe joined the Ministry of Foreign Affairs in 1968 and served in various positions in the embassies of Myanmar in Israel, Malaysia, Germany, Thailand and Japan. From 1990 to 1993, and from 1997 to 2001, he served as Secretary of Myanmar’s National Commission for Environmental Affairs. He also served as Chairman of the Senior Officials for the Environment for the Association of South-East Asian Nations (ASEAN),

From 2001 to 2010, he served as the Ambassador of Myanmar to the United Nations. He also served as Vice-Chairman of the Myanmar National Human Rights Commission from 2011 to 2013. In 2013, he worked closely with Aung San Suu Kyi on the Letpadaung Copper Mine Investigation Commission.

References

Burmese diplomats
Permanent Representatives of Myanmar to the United Nations
University of Yangon alumni
1945 births
Living people